Francisco Hernández de Córdoba (– 1526) is usually reputed as the founder of Nicaragua, and in fact he founded two important Nicaraguan cities, Granada and León. The currency of Nicaragua is named the córdoba in his memory.

Córdoba was an officer of Pedro Arias Dávila, known also as Pedrarias Dávila. Hernán Cortés and Hernán Ponce de León supported Córdoba during the conquest of Nicaragua in 1524, in return for support against Cristóbal de Olid. Dávila considered Córdoba an insurrectionist and a traitor, and finally captured and beheaded him.

His remains were found in 2000 in León Viejo, Nicaragua.

References

External links

Spanish conquistadors
Spanish colonization of the Americas
16th-century Spanish people
16th-century Nicaraguan people
City founders
1470s births
1526 deaths
People executed for treason against Spain
People executed by Spain by decapitation
Executed Spanish people
History of Nicaragua